Ecological regression is a statistical technique which runs regression on aggregates, often used in political science and history to estimate group voting behavior from aggregate data.

For example, if counties have a known Democratic vote (in percentage) D, and a known percentage of Catholics, C, then running a linear regression of dependent variable D against independent variable C will give D = a + bC. If the regression gives D = .22 + .45C for example, then the estimated Catholic vote (C = 1) is 67% Democratic and the non-Catholic vote (C = 0) is 22% Democratic. The technique has been often used in litigation brought under the Voting Rights Act of 1965 to see how blacks and whites voted.

See also
Ecological correlation
Ecological fallacy

References

Further reading
  advanced techniques
 
  with guide to the literature

Covariance and correlation